Tawau Municipal Council (abbreviated MPT) is the municipal council which administrates the town and municipalities area of Tawau in the state of Sabah, Malaysia.

History 
The municipal council is formed in 1982 following the merged between Tawau Town Board and Rural District Council on 1 January 1982. When Resident's office was abolished in the year, the chairman's office was taken over by an officer from the Public Service titled "Commissioner". In addition to being the Chairman, the commissioner is also the Head of Department before the commissioner title was replaced by the President and work officers of the municipal secretary following the establishment of the municipal council.

President of Tawau Municipal Council (Presiden) 
Since 1982, the town has been led by several presidents. The previous presidents are listed as below:

References

External links 

  

Tawau
Local government in Sabah
Municipal councils in Malaysia